Nabil Bank Limited (previously known as Nepal Arab Bank Limited) is the first private commercial bank in Nepal. Founded in 1984, the bank has branches across the nation and its head office in Durbar Marg, Kathmandu.

It began as the first bank in Nepal incepted by multinational (primarily foreign) investors (as Nepal Arab Bank Ltd) on 12 July 1984.  The bank was incorporated with the objective of providing modern, international-standard financial services to businesses. 

Its Dubai government-owned majority share was purchased in 1995 by Nepal's only billionaire businessman, Binod Chaudhary. It maintains its head office at its Nabil Center, Durbar Marg flanking the chief avenue of the capital leading to its grand palace. Nabil Bank operates through its wide network of 248 branch offices, 271 ATMs, numerous POS terminals, and remittance agents spread across the nation.

The Bank also has more than 200 international correspondent banking relationships. Nabil Bank operates its investment banking arm through its subsidiary Nabil Investment Banking Ltd.

Nabil bank had acquired Nepal Bangladesh Bank in July 2022.

On 22 December 2022, Nabil Bank launched nBank, a neo banking service that works as a virtual branch of the bank. 

Gyanendra Dhungana was appointed the chief executive officer on 1 July, 2022 after the tenure of the celebrity banker Anil Keshary Shah was over.

External links
 Official Website

References

Banks of Nepal
Banks established in 1984
1984 establishments in Nepal